This is an incomplete list of awards and nominations received by Chinese-American Mandopop artist Wang Leehom.

Golden Lotus Awards

The Golden Lotus Awards (Macau International Movie & Television Festival) (Chinese: 金蓮花獎/金莲花奖; pinyin: Jīn liánhuā jiǎng) are presented by Macau Film and Television Media Association and China International Cultural Communication Center. It recognizes Excellence in film and television.

Golden Melody Awards
The Golden Melody Awards are presented annually by the Government Information Office of the Republic of China (Taiwan). It recognises achievement in music production and is M-pop's equivalent to the Grammy Awards.

Chinese Music Awards
The Chinese Music Awards are presented annually by Beijing Music Radio. It is one of mainland China's equivalents to the Grammy Awards.

HITO Radio Music Awards
The HITO Radio Music Awards are given annually by HITO Radio, the parent company of Taiwanese radio station Hit FM. The order is not specified for the Top 10 Songs of the Year.

1996
 Best New Artist of 1996, The People's Daily Newspaper, Taiwan
 Best New Artist of 1996, Push Magazine, Taiwan

1998
 Top 20 of 1998, Channel V: "Revolution" (公轉自轉)
 10 Best Albums of the Year, News Media Group, Malaysia: "Revolution" (公轉自轉)
 10 Best Albums of the Year, Chinese Musicians' Association, Taiwan: "Revolution" (公轉自轉)

1999
 Best Producer, Golden Melody Awards, Taiwan: "Revolution" (公轉自轉)
 Best Male Vocalist, Golden Melody Awards, Taiwan: "Revolution" (公轉自轉)
 Best Producer, Golden Melody Awards, Singapore: "Revolution" (公轉自轉)

2000
 Best New Male Artist, HK Radio Station 
 Top 20 of 1999, Channel V: "Julia" 
 10 Best Albums of the Year, Chinese Musicians' Association: "Impossible to Miss You" (不可能錯過妳)
 Top 10 Songs of the Year, Chinese Musicians' Association: "Crying Palm" (流淚手心) 
 Best Male Vocalist, MTV Asia 
 Best Composer, Golden Melody Awards, Malaysia: "Impossible to Miss You" (不可能錯過妳) 
 Best Male Vocalist, Golden Melody Awards, Malaysia: "Impossible to Miss You" (不可能錯過妳)
 Best Male Performer, 1st Asia Chinese Music Awards 
 Best Composer, 1st Asia Chinese Music Awards 
 Top 15 Hits, 1st Asia Chinese Music Awards

2001
 Top 20 of 2000, Channel V: "Forever's First Day" (永遠的第一天) 
 Best Singer-Songwriter, Channel V 
 Best Song, MTV Asia: "The One and Only" (唯一) 
 Best Song, CCTV-MTV Asia: "Descendents of the Dragon" (龍的傳人) 
 Best Composer-Artist, Golden Melody Awards, Malaysia: "The One and Only" (唯一) 
 Best Producer, Golden Melody Awards, Malaysia: "The One and Only" (唯一) 
 Top 10 Songs, Golden Melody Awards, Malaysia: "The One and Only" (唯一)
 Soaring Artists, 23rd Annual RTHK Music Award; Bronze 
 All China Most Popular Artist, 23rd Annual RTHK Music Award; Silver 
 Best Composer, 1st Global Chinese Music Awards

2002
 Best Male Vocalist, CCTV-MTV Asia 
 Top 20 Songs, CCTV-MTV Asia: "The One and Only" (唯一) 
 Best Composer-Artist, Golden Melody Awards, Malaysia: "The One and Only" (唯一)
 Best Lyricist, Golden Melody Awards, Malaysia: "The One and Only" (唯一)
 Best Mandarin Song: "The One and Only" (唯一), TVB Jade Solid Gold Music Awards 
 Outstanding Performance, TVB Jade Solid Gold Music Awards; Silver

2003
 Most Popular Male Artist, HITO Music Awards 2003
 Best Song of the Year, HITO Music Awards 2003: "W-H-Y"
 Longest No. 1 Song, HITO Music Awards 2003: "W-H-Y" 
 Best Music Video, Channel V: "Two People Do Not Equal to Us" (兩個人不等於我們) 
 Top 10 Songs of the Year, Chinese Musicians' Association: "Love, Love, Love"
 Top 10 Albums of the Year, Chinese Musicians' Association: Unbelievable (不可思議)
 Top 10 Albums of the Year, China Times: Unbelievable: (不可思議) 
 Media's Choice Artist, Channel V 
 Top Fashion Trendsetter, Cosmopolitan, China 
 Top 10 Songs of the Year, HiTFM, "You're Not Here" (妳不在), and "The One and Only" (Japanese version) (唯一) (日文版) 
 Most Popular Composer, 3rd Global Chinese Music Awards
 Top 20 Hits, 3rd Global Chinese Music Awards: "Two People Do Not Equal to Us" (兩個人不等於我們)

2004
 Best Male Singer Award, Channel V
 DJ's Favorite Album, HITO Music Awards: "Unbelievable" (不可思議)
 Top 10 Songs of the Year, HITO Music Awards 2004: "You're Not Here" (你不在)
 10 Best Albums of the Year: "Unbelievable" (不可思議)
 Most Popular Asian Male Singer, Golden Melody Awards, Singapore: "Unbelievable" (不可思議)
 The Best Songs of the Year, Golden Melody Awards, Singapore: "Love Is Everywhere" (愛無所不在) 
 10 Best Albums of the Year, Dong Xi Nan Bei Da Sheu Sheng Awards: "Unbelievable" (不可思議)
 Favorite Asian Artist, Channel V, Thailand 
 Most Popular Composer, 4h Global Chinese Music Awards
 Best Album, 4h Global Chinese Music Awards: "Unbelievable" (不可思議)
 Top 20 Hits, 4h Global Chinese Music Awards: "You're Not Here" (你不在)
 Buzz Asia Taiwan, MTV Video Music Awards, Japan: "Last Night"

2005
 Most Popular Male Artists, 5th Global Chinese Music Awards. 
 Top 5 Most Popular Artists, 5th Global Chinese Music Awards 
 Top 25 Hits, 5th Global Chinese Music Awards; "The Heart's Sun and Moon" (心中的日月) 
 Best Music Composition, 5th Global Chinese Music Awards: "Forever Love" 
 Most Popular Regional Artist, 12th Singapore Hits Award

2006
 Best Male Artist, HITO Music Awards 2006
 Best Music Arrangement, HITO Music Awards 2006
 The Most Popular Voted Composing Artist, HITO Music Awards 2006
 Top 10 Songs of the Year, HITO Music Awards 2006: "The Heart's Sun and Moon" (心中的日月)
 Most Popular Chinese Singer: 13th EDC Dong Fang Feng Yun Bang Awards (Taiwan Area)
 Favorite Mandarin Song, TVB Jade Solid Gold Selection: "Kiss Goodbye"
 Best Composer Song, MusicRadio Awards: "Mistake in the Flower Fields" (花田錯)
 Best Taiwan Male Singer, MusicRadio Awards 
 Best Producer, MusicRadio Awards 
 Favorite Artist Taiwan, MTV Asia Awards 
 Top 20 Hits, 6th Global Chinese Music Awards: "Kiss Goodbye"
 Best Producer, 6th Global Chinese Music Awards: "Heroes of Earth" (蓋世英雄)

2007
 Best Endorser, 1st Mobile Oscar 2007
 Best Composing Singer (Hong Kong & Taiwan Area), 13th Chinese Music Awards
 Most Popular Male Artist (Hong Kong & Taiwan Area), 13th Chinese Music Awards
 Most Popular Song of the Year (Hong Kong & Taiwan Area), 13th Chinese Music Awards: "Big City, Small Love" (大城小愛)
 Top 10 Albums of the Year, KKBOX Music Charts: "Heroes of Earth" (蓋世英雄)
 Top 20 Songs of the Year, KKBOX Music Charts: "Kiss Goodbye"

2011
 Most Valuable New Director, Wang Leehom for Love in Disguise, 23rd Annual Harbin Film Festival

2012
 Best Asian Artist, 2012 Mnet Asian Music Awards

References

Wang, Leehom
Wang, Leehom